is the third single released by the Japanese boyband Kanjani Eight. The single was a triple A side release, featuring two versions of the CD single (a limited and standard release) which contained two different comedy sketches for the song Sukiyanen, Osaka. The song, Mugendai, was the theme song to the Japanese theatrical release of the movie, Robots.

Track listing

Regular Edition
 " Sukiyanen Osaka "
 " Oh! Enka "
 " Mugendai "
 " Oh! Enka" <Original Karaoke>

Limited Edition
 " Sukiyanen Osaka "
 " Oh! Enka "
 " Mugendai "
 " Sukiyanen Osaka <Original Karaoke> "

Charts

2005 singles
Kanjani Eight songs